Holzhausen an der Haide is a municipality in the district of Rhein-Lahn, in Rhineland-Palatinate, in western Germany.

Holzhausen is the birthplace of Nicolaus August Otto, the inventor of the "Otto Engine".

References

Municipalities in Rhineland-Palatinate
Rhein-Lahn-Kreis